When You Are Engulfed in Flames is a collection of essays by bestselling American humorist David Sedaris. It was published on June 3, 2008.

Sedaris's sixth book assembles essays on various situations such as trying to make coffee when the water is shut off, associations in the French countryside, buying drugs in a mobile home in rural North Carolina, having a lozenge fall from your mouth into the lap of a fellow passenger on a plane, armoring windows with LP covers to protect the house from neurotic songbirds, lancing a boil from another's backside, and venturing to Japan to quit smoking. Little, Brown and Company issued a first-run hardcover release of 100,000 copies.

Television appearances
Sedaris was a guest on The Daily Show with Jon Stewart on Comedy Central on June 3, 2008.  During the interview he recommended moving to Hiroshima, Japan for three months to stop smoking.  This smoking cessation method, which cost the author $23,000, is the subject of the last essay of his book.  He also described the genesis for the name of his book.  It was the name of a chapter in a book he found in a hotel room in Hiroshima, Japan. He also appeared on The Late Show on CBS, with David Letterman.

Cover art

The first-edition cover was designed by Chip Kidd. It features an early painting by Vincent van Gogh.

Contents
 It's Catching – A work on Sedaris' partner Hugh and his mom
 Keeping Up – David trying to keep up with Hugh, who walks too fast
 The Understudy – Memories of a bad white trash babysitter.
 This Old House – David moves into a boarding house.
 Buddy, Can You Spare a Tie? – David's recollections on various bad clothes and "accessories"
 Road Trips – Being picked up by a driver who wants a blow job.
 What I Learned – Talking about Princeton
 That's Amore – A rude neighbor named Helen
 The Monster Mash – David's fascination with corpses.
 In the Waiting Room – Language barriers and the consequences
 Solution to Saturday's Puzzle – David's throat lozenge falls onto a bitchy airplane seatmate
 Adult Figures Charging Toward a Concrete Toadstool – His parents collecting art
 Memento Mori – Buying a skeleton for Hugh
 All the Beauty You Will Ever Need – Making coffee without water and his relationship with Hugh
 Town and Country – A cabbie in New York who talks about his sex life
 Aerial – Using album covers to scare away birds
 The Man in the Hut – A neighbor in France who was sent to prison for molesting his wife's grandchildren
 Of Mice and Men – About icebreaker conversations
 April in Paris – About interacting with animals and David's recollections of a spider
 Crybaby – David sits next to a grieving man on a plane.
 Old Faithful – Hugh lances a boil on David's backside
 The Smoking Section – David tries to stop smoking in Japan

References

2008 non-fiction books
Works by David Sedaris
Little, Brown and Company books
American essay collections